Deprato Mounds (16 CO 37), also known as the Ferriday Mounds, is a multi-mound archaeological site located in Concordia Parish, Louisiana. The site shows occupation from the Troyville period to the Middle Coles Creek period (400 to 800 CE). The largest mound at the site has been dated by radiocarbon analysis and decorated pottery to about 600 CE.

The site was added to the National Register of Historic Places on October 22, 1998.

Description
The site is a complex of five platform mounds and a central plaza area taking up about four acres of land to the east of the confluence of Black Bayou and Bayou Cocodrie. The mounds now appear smaller than they did in the past because extensive flooding in the centuries since their construction has deposited  of sediment over the base of the mounds and the plaza.

Mound D was demolished to provide fill for a highway construction project. Mound E was built on as the site of a private house. During excavations, human remains were found in three of the mounds. The site has been purchased by The Archaeological Conservancy, a nonprofit organization that plans to protect the site from future degradation.

See also
 Frogmore Mound Site
 Troyville Mounds
 Culture, phase, and chronological table for the Mississippi Valley
 National Register of Historic Places listings in Concordia Parish, Louisiana

References

Notes

External links
 Louisiana Life Magazine:Mounds of Mystery
 Deprato Mounds at waymarking.com

Troyville culture
Archaeological sites of the Coles Creek culture
Mounds in Louisiana
Geography of Concordia Parish, Louisiana